JLU may refer to:

 Jagran Lakecity University, in Bhopal, Madhya Pradesh, India
 Jalu-Jo-Chunrd railway station, in Pakistan
 Jilin University, in China
 Justice League United, a fictional superhero team 
 Justice League Unlimited, an American television series
 Justus Liebig University of Giessen, in Hesse, Germany